Bukit Cherakah is a hill in Kuala Selangor District, Selangor, Malaysia with the height of . It is one of three prominent peaks along the coast of Selangor. Bukit Cherakah gives its name to a forest reserve which includes the Shah Alam Community Forest and the National Botanical Garden Shah Alam.

There are several hiking routes to the peak.

See also 
 List of mountains in Malaysia

References 

Kuala Selangor District
Nature sites of Selangor